NGC 4086 is a lenticular galaxy located 330 million light-years away in the constellation Coma Berenices. NGC 4086 was discovered by astronomer Heinrich d'Arrest on May 2, 1864 and is a member of the NGC 4065 Group.

NGC 4086 is classified as a LINER galaxy.

See also
 List of NGC objects (4001–5000)

References

External links
 

4086
038290
Coma Berenices
Astronomical objects discovered in 1864
Lenticular galaxies
NGC 4065 Group
LINER galaxies
07076
Discoveries by Heinrich Louis d'Arrest